Schlopy is a surname. Notable people with the surname include:

 Alex Schlopy (born 1992), American skier
 Erik Schlopy (born 1972), American skier
 Todd Schlopy (born 1961), American football player and movie cameraman